Algiers is an American-English post-punk band from Atlanta, Georgia, United States, formed in 2012. Algiers pulls from a divergent number of musical (and nonmusical) influences; the most notable of which being post-punk, hip-hop, Southern Gothic literature, and the concept of the Other. Their sound has been described as dystopian soul due to its somber mood, afrofolk inspired vocal approach, and heavy emphasis on atonal textures.

History 
Fisher, Mahan, and Tesche (of the experimental band Lyonnais) met and grew up playing music together in Atlanta, Georgia, but officially formed in London in 2012 with the release of their first single. They chose the name Algiers in reference to a key historical site of anti-colonial struggle, symbolizing a contested space where violence, racism, resistance, and religion commingle.

Their live show has been described as "recalling at various points PIL's dub-style expansions, Afrobeat, industrial, no wave, free jazz, Suicide, the XTC of "Travels in Nihilon," Nick Cave's fire and brimstone, and musique concrète."

2012–2016: Formation and debut album 
The group released their first single "Blood" in January 2012 via Atlanta based label Double Phantom. Byron Coley for The Wire wrote: "Although the fusion may have been touched upon in recordings related to both The Birthday Party and The Gun Club, Algiers are dedicated to grafting gospel music onto post-punk guitar-scuzz...this record is mesmerising and really sucks you in with its weird power."

The band's self-titled debut album was released through Matador on June 2, 2015. Ahead of their eponymous release, the band opened for Interpol, during their North American Tour. Matt Tong, formerly of Bloc Party, began playing drums for Algiers at this time.

In the spring of the following year, the band premiered and toured the Eastern US screening the sixth installment of Brendan Canty of Fugazi and Christoph Green's Burn to Shine film series. Burn to Shine Atlanta was curated by Lee Tesche of Algiers and filmed in the summer of 2007. This was followed by a live installation with renowned Japanese flower artist Makoto Azuma that saw the band performing in the Californian desert underneath a palm tree suspended in mid air.

2017–present: The Underside of Power, There Is No Year and collaborations 
On June 23, 2017, Algiers released their second studio album, The Underside of Power. The album was produced by Adrian Utley of Portishead and Ali Chant and mixed by Randall Dunn. This coincided with a European stadium tour that found the band opening up for Depeche Mode and remixing the lead single from their Spirit album. At the same time, it was revealed that Algiers had also been working in the studio with Massive Attack and were releasing an experimental tape and zine series. Much of 2018 saw the band on the road with Young Fathers, a DIY tour with Downtown Boys, and a special set at the Black Cat 25th anniversary party.

In the lead up to their next album, the band released the critically acclaimed, explosive, free jazz single, Can the Sub_Bass Speak? Their third full length album for Matador, There Is No Year, followed on January 17, 2020. On February 1, the band made their network television debut performing "Dispossession" on The Late Show with Stephen Colbert.

Post-release, members of the band traveled to Algeria for the first time and met with Algerian Independence fighter Saadi Yacef. His memoirs, Souvenirs de la Bataille d'Alger, served as the basis for Gillo Pontecorvo's film The Battle of Algiers, which Yacef helped produce, and was one of the inspirations for the band's name. This marked a frenzied period of activity and collaboration for the group beginning with their featured appearance on Massive Attack's Eutopia audiovisual EP alongside Christiana Figueres; the release of “Cleveland 20/20” a 50-minute expansion and re-imagining of their song “Cleveland” in the wake of the George Floyd protests; Fisher's guest feature on Billy Woods and Moor Mother's BRASS album; Mahan's first solo outing as Dead Meat; as well as Tesche and Mahan releasing two albums as the award winning multimedia collaboration, Nun Gun, with visual artist Brad Feuerhelm. Nun Gun's debut release, Mondo Decay, pairs a book of Feuerhelm's photography with an accompanying original soundtrack cassette that features guest contributions from Mark Stewart of The Pop Group, Adrian Sherwood, ONO, Mourning [A] BLKstar, artists Luiza Prado and Farbod Kokabi, as well as authors Blake Butler, Michael Salu, and Sohail Daulatzai.

On February 24, 2023, Algiers released their fourth studio album, Shook.

Members 
 Franklin James Fisher – vocals, guitar, piano, Rhodes piano, cello, percussion, sampling
 Ryan Mahan – bass, synthesisers, piano, percussion, drum programming, backing vocals
 Lee Tesche – guitar, loops, percussion, backing vocals, letter
 Matt Tong – drums, percussion, backing vocals

Discography

Albums

EPs and singles 
 "Blood" / "Black Eunuch" (2012, Double Phantom Records)
 "Mute Studio Sessions" (2015, Matador)
 "Walk Like A Panther / Walk Like A Panther (Uniform Remix)" (2017, Matador)
 "Blood" / "Black Eunuch" (2017, Geographic North)
"September 2017" (2017, Tour only cassette)
"1st November 1954" (2018, Tour only cassette)
 "Can The Sub_Bass Speak?" (2019, Matador)
 "Void" (2019, Adult Swim Singles Club).
 "Can the Sub_Bass Speak? b/w It All Comes Around Again" (2020)
 "Bite Back" (featuring Billy Woods and Backxwash) (2022, Matador)
 "Irreversible Damage" (featuring Zack de la Rocha) (2022, Matador)

Remixes 
Liars – "Black Eunuch (Liars Remix)" (2015, Matador)
Uniform – "Walk Like A Panther (Uniform Remix)" (2017, Matador)
Gaika – "Cleveland (Gaika Remix / Spectacular Empire Dub)" (2017, Matador)
Depeche Mode – "Where's The Revolution (Algiers Remix)" & "Where's The Revolution (Algiers Click Farm Remix)" from Spirit (Remixes) (2017, Columbia)
Prurient – "Death March (Prurient Remix)" (2017, Matador)
Soviet Soviet – "Ghost (Algiers Remix)" from Ghost (EP) (2020, Copyu Records)
Kaufmann Frust – "Armee mit tausend Köpfen (Algiers Remix)"
Ganser – "Told You So (Algiers Remix)" from Look At The Sun

Music videos

References

External links 
 Band website
 Algiers Official YouTube
 Algiers Official Spotify

Alternative rock groups from Georgia (U.S. state)
Indie rock musical groups from Georgia (U.S. state)
2012 establishments in Georgia (U.S. state)
Matador Records artists
American musical trios
Musical groups established in 2012
Musical groups from Atlanta
Political music groups